Mueang Phichit is the capital district (amphoe mueang) of Phichit province, central Thailand.

History
In 1917 the district's name was changed from Mueang to Tha Luang (ท่าหลวง). In 1938 it was renamed Mueang Phichit.

Administration
The district is divided into 16 sub-districts (tambons), which are further subdivided into 134 villages (mubans). The town (thesaban mueang) Phichit covers tambon Nai Mueang. There are three more sub-district municipalities (thesaban tambons). Tha Lo and Hua Dong each cover parts of their tambons, and Wang Krot parts of tambon Ban Bung. There are a further 15 tambon administrative organizations (TAO).

Missing numbers are tambon which now form Sak Lek District.

References

External links
amphoe.com (Thai)

Mueang Phichit